In horse racing, the starting price (SP) is the odds prevailing on a particular horse in the on-course fixed-odds betting market at the time a race begins. The method by which SPs are set for each runner varies in different countries but is generally by consensus of an appointed panel on the basis of their observations of the fluctuation in prices at the racetrack.   

This is done as follows: 

For each horse the odds offered by the bookmakers are ordered into a list from longest to shortest. This list is then divided into halves and the SP is the shortest odds available in the half containing the longest odds. Thus the SP or a longer price will have been offered by at least half the bookmakers in the sample. 

Note: This method is slightly different from the method of calculating the median.

The principal function of a starting price is to determine returns on those winning bets where fixed odds have not been taken at the time the bet was struck.

Typically, on the day of the race, UK bookmakers offer a choice between placing a bet at SP, or taking a fixed price. When viewing future races, SP may be the only option available.

Some bookmakers offer best odds guaranteed, meaning that if a punter takes fixed odds on a race when the bet is struck and the SP turns out to be better (that is, higher), then if the punter wins, the payout is calculated using the SP.  This is aimed at removing hesitancy among punters prompted by fears of taking what might prove to be a poor (that is, low) price before the race.

In the United Kingdom, the stake on an SP bet is returned if the horse is withdrawn before the race starts. For fixed-odds (ante-post) bets, the stake is retained by the bookmaker.

References

Bibliography

Horse racing terminology
Wagering
Gambling terminology